Xylaria polymorpha, commonly known as dead man's fingers, is a saprobic fungus. It is a common inhabitant of forest and woodland areas, usually growing from the bases of rotting or injured tree stumps and decaying wood. It has also been known to colonize substrates like woody legume pods, petioles, and herbaceous stems. It is characterized by its elongated upright, clavate, or strap-like stromata poking up through the ground, much like fingers. The genus Xylaria contains about 100 species of cosmopolitan fungi. Polymorpha means "many forms". As its name suggests, it has a very variable but often club-shaped fruiting body (stroma) resembling burned wood.

Often this fungus is found with a multitude of separate "digits" but at times the individual parts will be fused together.

Belonging to the phylum of fungus known as Ascomycetes (division Mycota) known as the sac fungi, they are characterized by a saclike structure, the ascus, which contains anything from four to eight ascospores in the sexual stage. The sac fungi are separated into subgroups based on whether asci arise singly or are borne in one of several types of fruiting structures, or ascocarps, and on the method of discharge of the ascospores. Many ascomycetes are plant pathogens, some are animal pathogens, a few are edible mushrooms, and many live on dead organic matter (as saprobes). The largest and most commonly known ascomycetes include the morel and the truffle, however, X. polymorpha is an inedible variety.

The dark fruiting body (often black or brown, but sometimes shades of blue/green) is white on the inside, with a blackened dotted area all around. This blackened surrounding area is made up of tiny structures called perithecia. The perithecia hold a layer of asci which contain the ascospores. The asci elongate into the ostiole, and discharge the ascospores outward. The spore distribution is a lengthy process, sometimes taking several months to complete this part of the life cycle, this is not a common trait amongst fungi, as is normally a much swifter process.

In springtime this fungus often produces a layer of white or bluish asexual spores called conidia, which grow on its surface and surrounding area.

References

External links

 Index Fungorum
 USDA ARS Fungal Database
 Xylaria polymorpha (Dead Man's Fingers
 Images
 Dead Man's Fingers
 https://mushroomobserver.org/name/show_name/2?q=2PwL3

Fungal tree pathogens and diseases
Xylariales
Fungi of Europe
Inedible fungi
Taxa named by Christiaan Hendrik Persoon
Fungi described in 1824